Simone Nassar Tebet (born 27 February 1970) is a Brazilian academic, lawyer, and politician who has served as the Brazilian Minister of Planning since 1 January 2023. A member of the Federal Senate for Mato Grosso do Sul since 2015, she was previously mayor of Três Lagoas from 2005 to 2010. She is a member of the Brazilian Democratic Movement Party, of which she was the leader in the Senate from 2018 to 2019.

Tebet ran for President of the Senate in 2021 against Rodrigo Pacheco, who was backed by both President Jair Bolsonaro and former President Luiz Inácio Lula da Silva's Workers' Party.

Tebet was a candidate for president in the 2022 Brazilian general election, running a centrist, pragmatic, and social liberal campaign and trying revive Third Way politics, opposing both President Bolsonaro and former President Lula. She said her priorities are social policies, like education, housing, and the environment.

She achieved third place with 4.16% of the vote. Tebet supported Lula in the second round against Bolsonaro. Some suggest that she was appointed Minister of Planning because of this endorsement.

Early life 
Tebet was born to governor, senator, and President of the National Congress Ramez Tebet and Fairte Nassar Tebet, a philanthropist, in 1970. She is of Lebanese descent on both her mother and father's sides.

She graduated in law from the Federal University of Rio de Janeiro and is a specialist in legal science from the Escola Superior de Magistratura, and has masters in state law from the Pontifical Catholic University of São Paulo.

She began her career as a professor in 1992, working at Dom Bosco Catholic University, Anhanguera-Uniderp University, and the Federal University of Mato Grosso do Sul.

Political career 
Simone Tebet started her career in 2002 when she was elected as a state representative in Mato Grosso do Sul with 25,251 votes, becoming the most voted woman that year. She has been described as a centre-right and centrist politician by the Brazilian media. During her presidential campaign, she said that she represents the "democratic center".

Mayor of Três Lagoas 
In 2004 she was elected for the first time as the first female mayor of Três Lagoas.

State Government 
On March 31, 2010, she resigned from the mayor's office to compose André Puccinelli's ticket in the election for the government of Mato Grosso do Sul, as a candidate for vice governor. With the ticket victorious, she became the state's first female vice-governor. Between April 2013 and January 2014, Simone headed the Government Secretariat.

Simone Tebet was also director of municipal affairs at the Association of Municipalities of Mato Grosso do Sul and a member of the Representative Council for the Midwest of the National Confederation of Municipalities.

Federal Senate 

In the 2014 parliamentary elections, she ran for senator for Mato Grosso do Sul, being elected on October 5.

Legislative Positions 
In August 2016, she voted in favor of impeaching Dilma Rousseff. In December of that same year, she voted in favor of the PEC do Teto dos Gastos Públicos.

In October 2017, she voted in favor of maintaining the mandate of Senator Aécio Neves, overturning the decision of the First Panel of the Federal Supreme Court in the process where he is accused of corruption and obstruction of justice for requesting two million reais from businessman Joesley Batista.

In June 2019, she voted against the government's Decree on Arms, which made it easier for citizens to carry and hold firearms.

Simone Tebet, was sworn in as senator of her state, on February 1, 2015. In April 2018, she was chosen leader of the MDB bench in the Federal Senate. It was a position she held until January 2019.

Indigenous Lands 
One of the main projects defended by Simone Tebet in the Federal Senate deals with the suspension of the demarcation of indigenous lands and the payment of compensation to farmers.  The proposal has been criticized by human rights organizations, who point to alleged conflicts of interest, pointing out that the Senator owns a farm in Caarapó , Mato Grosso do Sul.  The municipality's recent history has been marked by violence against indigenous populations which, according to a report by Cimi (Indigenist Missionary Council) would be commanded by land grabbers and landowners.

Covaxin Investigation 
Tebet spearheaded an inquiry into Covaxin fraud in the Senate. She questioned the leader of a taskforce that distributed vaccines and why the contract with the Indian company was cancelled. She reportedly found 20 instances of fraud and said that the documents "should have never gone to the health ministry." She also found multiple translation and formatting errors that the Chief of Staff of the Presidency Onyx Lorenzoni had seemingly ignored, along with cheaper vaccine alternatives like Pfizer and found financial error in the work of Élcio Franco, who is now under investgation by Rosa Weber, a justice of the Supreme Federal Court. In this way, she became one of the main critics of Jair Bolsonaro's COVID-19 response.

Senate Politics 

In the elections for the presidency of the Federal Senate of Brazil in 2017, Simone was a pre-candidate for president of the house. However, her party nominated Senator Eunício Oliveira to run for that position. In July 2017, the senator voted in favor of labor reform.

In 2019, the senator disputed the nomination of her party for the candidacy for the presidency of the Federal Senate. However, Renan Calheiros was nominated, losing the election among his party senators by 7 votes to 5. Subsequently, Simone launched a separate candidacy for the position, but ended up withdrawing to increase the chances of a victory for Davi Alcolumbre ( DEM ) over Renan Calheiros, which eventually occurred.

In 2019, she was elected president of the Constitution, Justice and Citizenship Commission, becoming the first woman to preside over the collegiate body. It is considered the most important one in the Senate.

In January 2021, she was nominated by her party to run for the Senate Presidency.  However, the MDB, the party to which Tebet is affiliated, withdrew from the senator's launch to run for office, after signaling the opposing candidate, Rodrigo Pacheco. In this way, Tebet's candidacy became independent. On February 1, 2021, Rodrigo Pacheco was elected president of the Senate, with votes from 57 senators, Tebet obtained 21 votes, placing herself in second place.

Other elections 
In the 2018 elections, after the arrest of the then candidate for the state government and governor, André Puccinelli, Simone was nominated for governor, however, she later withdrew from the race due to family issues.

Presidential campaign 

Tebet presented herself as a candidate for the Presidency in the 2022 elections, standing on a Third Way platform. Her candiacy was seen as a non-controversial replacement to the failed pre-candidacies of João Doria and Sergio Moro, being supported by their former aides.

In February, she announced economist Elena Landau as the campaign economic coordinator. Landau is known for her work in former President Fernando Henrique Cardoso's administration and for being part of LIVRES, a social liberal movement.

The Brazilian Democratic Movement, in a virtual convention, officialized on 27 July 2022 the candidacy of Tebet for President. MDB is still split however, as part of some leaderships endorse Lula, but Tebet's candidacy has the support of the party's national president Baleia Rossi. Since she presented her candidacy, factions of the party in certain states like Rio Grande do Sul and Bahia said that they would not support any candidate for president from the party and endorsed former President Luiz Inácio Lula da Silva. After talks of some MDB factions with Lula, the party published a note signed by member of 19 states endorsing senator Tebet.

The party formed a coalition with PSDB and Cidadania, nominating Mara Gabrilli, PSDB, a quadriplegic senator from São Paulo as vice president. It is the first presidential election since 1994 that the PSDB has not nominated their own candidate.

On October 2, 2022, Tebet failed to reach the run-off, garnering just 4.16% of the vote.

Platform 
Simone Tebet presented her government plan on August 15, the last day for candidates to register their candidacy with the Electoral Justice. The document has 48 pages, where the presidential candidate proposes a permanent minimum income program, tax and administrative reforms and zero tolerance for illegal deforestation.

Her platform has been connected to what many view as issues more important to women such as the environment and education, and with this push, Tebet has portrayed herself as the candidate for women disaffected by Bolsonaro.

Results 
On October 2, 2022, Tebet failed to reach the run-off, garnering just 4.16% of the vote. She gained greater precentages in the North, South, and Southeast, especially in São Paulo, but faltered in the Northeast. However she passed Ciro Gomes to become the third place candidate and a kingmaker in the second round.

Endorsement of Lula 
Tebet met with Geraldo Alckmin, Lula's running mate, on October 4, presenting her governmental plan to his and Lula's campaign. While the Brazilian Democratic Movement released its members, with Governor Ibaneis Rocha of the Federal District endorsing Bolsonaro in the second round, citing the concern for democracy, Tebet endorsed Lula.

Other members of her coalition like Cidadania endorsed Lula while the PSDB and Podemos remaining neutral. Of the former presidents and presidential candidates that supported her candidacy, Fernando Henrique Cardoso and José Serra, both former supporters of Lula supported his candidacy, while Michel Temer supported Bolsonaro.

She also spoke against gun violence in South America on an Instagram post in her profile and how Lula can get rid of it by disarming the population from gun ownership and make streets of Brazil safer, and overturning right-wing gun policies. However, with all her support and the reward of a ministry in the Lula government, many suggest that she is building a platform for a more successful run in 2026, representing a disaffected center.

Minister of Planning and Budget

Choice of Ministry 
After the 2022 election, it was widely considered that Tebet would be given a ministry, especially since she had not run for reelection in the Senate. It was reported that Tebet desired the Ministry of Social Development, which would have allowed a large public profile to control the allocation of the Bolsa Família/Auxílio Brasil program. This appointment was quashed by the Workers' Party who worried about both Tebet's "independence" and the possibility of a future presidencial candidacy. Wellington Dias, the former Governor of Maranhão, was chosen for the position.

The Workers' Party wanted to give Tebet the Ministry of the Environment, but she wanted to give the ministry to her personal friend Marina Silva. Eventually after considering the position of Minister of Cities and of Agriculture, Lula decided to give her the Ministry of Planning and Budget.

Political positions

Women's rights 
Tebet considers herself to be a feminist, saying that women's rights should not be a left-wing theme. When Tebet assumed the leadership of the feminine caucus, she said that a "feminine perspective" is necessary for policy making in areas such as healthcare, education and public transportation.

In regards to women's policy, Tebet supports gender quotas for the Congress, saying that 50% is the ideal for all legislative bodies. In 2022, Tebet also pledged to have a gender balanced cabinet. Tebet opposes the legalization of abortion, but said that it should not be a political taboo. As leader of the feminine caucus, she voted against criminalizing abortion in cases of rape.

Tebet has lamented the classification of feminism as a leftist movement, saying in the SBT debate to Padre Kelmon, a reported priest and candidate of the PTB,  that "My concept of a feminist is very different from yours. For me, being a feminist is defending women's rights. I am Catholic and I regret your selective view. I'm against abortion, and that doesn't make me any less of a feminist. Feminism in Brazil should be understood not as a leftist agenda, but as a Christian one."

She has been criticised by some on the left for using feminism as a "prop" without supporting true feminist causes like secularism and free access to abortion while others on the right have said that her purported Christianity is a mask for a more radical feminism. She has maintained her position to be one of Christian feminism.

Experts say that feminism has various currents and movements and Tebet represents a moderate but not anti-feminist position. However some have said that given some of her more conservative policy proposals she is no more feminist than many of the other candidates.

Climate and Agricultural policy 
Given Mato Grosso do Sul's deep involvement with Brazil's agricultural economy, Tebet has frequently been an activist for agribusiness. However, during her campaign for president she has become a more frequent advocate for climate protections and controls. During the Globo debate she said to Bolsonaro that "Your administration is the one that made biomes, forests and my Pantanal wetlands burn. Your administration cared for miners and loggers, and protected them. You, in this regard, were the worst president in Brazil’s history."
She has said that she wants a "zero tolerance policy" for illegal deforestation and advocated for increases in funding in Brazil's Northeast to produce solar and wind power on unused coasts and plains. Along with these investments, she said she planned to offer carbon credits and regulate fisheries to create a more sustainable system

Her policies have been described as a balance between environmental policies and pro-agriculture policies. In a visit to Montes Claros, she said that "All regions have conditions to be fertile, to produce, to generate employment and income, the north of Minas is no different. What is lacking is the political will to definitively bring a large irrigation project so that the region can produce the fruits and export, generate employment and income, finishing the dams and guaranteeing dignity for its people." She has advocated for further irrigation into northern regions of Mato Grosso do Sul, where continued runoff is polluting the Amazon, and said "food needs to arrive faster and cheaper".

Her policies have been criticized for emphasizing investment rather than protection, while protecting harmful farms. She has disputed these claims, connecting deforestation to drought in Brazil's agricultural states.

Personal life 
Tebet is married to Eduardo Rocha, a state deputy and secretary of the Civil House of Mato Grosso do Sul, in the government of Eduardo Riedel, with whom she has two daughters, Maria Eduarda and Maria Fernanda.

Tebet is Catholic.

Electoral history

Notes

References 

1970 births
Living people
BBC 100 Women
Brazilian Democratic Movement politicians
Brazilian educators
Brazilian people of Lebanese descent
Candidates for President of Brazil
Federal University of Rio de Janeiro alumni
Government ministers of Brazil
Mayors of places in Brazil
Members of the Federal Senate (Brazil)
People from Três Lagoas
Pontifical Catholic University of São Paulo alumni
Women government ministers of Brazil